The DRG Class SVT 137 was a class of streamlined diesel railcars of the Deutsche Reichsbahn-Gesellschaft and later of the Deutsche Bundesbahn (as class VT 04) and the Deutsche Reichsbahn.

Subclasses and Technical Data 
Based on the prototype DRG Class SVT 877 there were four different subclasses and one experimental train:
 "Bauart Hamburg", two sections, Jacobs bogies, 2’Bo’2’, No 137 149 - 152 and No 137 224 - 232
 "Bauart Leipzig", three sections, Jacobs-bogies, 2'Bo'Bo'2', No 137 153 – 154 and 137 233 – 234, DR 183 251
 "Bauart Köln", three sections, 14 built, conventional bogies "Bauart Görlitz",  2'Bo'+2'2'+Bo'2', 160 t, 132 Seats, No 137 273 - 278 and 137 851 - 858.
 "Bauart Berlin", four sections including a power / postal car, single slow running diesel , 2'Bo'+2'2'+'2'2'+Bo'2', 210.6 t, 126 seats, No 137 901 - 903
 SVT 137 155, designed by the constructor of the Schienenzeppelin, Franz Kruckenberg, built 1934–1938, diesel-hydraulic, three cars, one powered cars at the head. Did not enter regular service. The construction led to the DB Class VT 10.5, DB Class VT 11.5 and the DR Class VT 18.16

Most SVT 137 were diesel-electric, the SVT 137 Bauart Leipzig No 137 153 – 154 had a diesel-hydraulic transmission, the SVT No 137 233 – 234 had a diesel-electric transmission.
Three sections of the SVT 137 902 were originally from the Dutch NS streamline '36 and used in this train. They didn't return to the NS after the war.

History 
Since the success of the SVT 877 "Flying Hamburger" DRG projected a set of Diesel multiple units for a high speed network from Berlin to several German cities. First built 1934/1935, the "Bauart Hamburg" showed some differences to the prototype: The number of seats was 77 instead of 99, the placement of the seats 2+1 instead of 3+1. The Bauart Hamburg was  longer.

The main line Berlin-Hannover-Cologne started July 1, 1935; the route Berlin-Leipzig-Erfurt-Frankfurt followed August 15, 1935. From 1936 a service Berlin-Nuremberg-Munich/Stuttgart was initiated for a real success and struggling their routes.

These trains did the route Berlin-Breslau-Beuthen (now: Berlin-Wrocław-Bytom) from May 15, 1936.

The SVT service was halted in August, 1939. During World War II some of the trains were used by the Wehrmacht as military trains.

After World War II some of the SVT 137 were handed over to other states. The SVT 137 274 was used in the American occupation zone; it was later transported to Fort Eustis, Virginia, USA, as a "technical interesting object". SVT 137 852 served the CSD in 1949 on the line Prague-Bratislava. SVT 137 855 entered service at the SZD USSR as trainset DP-14.

The remaining SVT 137 were used by the Deutsche Bundesbahn as VT 04 / VT 06 and the Deutsche Reichsbahn as class 137, later class 183.

DRG SVT 137 225 "Bauart Hamburg" (picture above) was used by the GDR government until 1975. In 1991 this train was repainted in its original colours. Today it is exhibited at Leipzig Hauptbahnhof.

References

External links 

 http://www.dbtrains.com/en/trainsets/epochII/SVT_Hamburg
 http://www.dbtrains.com/en/trainsets/epochII/SVT_Leipzig
 http://www.dbtrains.com/en/trainsets/epochII/SVT_Koln
 http://www.dbtrains.com/en/trainsets/epochII/SVT_Berlin
 http://www.railfaneurope.net/pix/de/diesel/dmu/historic/SVT137/pix.html good picture site
 https://web.archive.org/web/20061231190335/http://www.verkehrsmuseum-dresden.de/de/presse/presse_Eisenbahnausstellung.htm 137 155 (Kruckenberg), German site
 http://www.hfi.tu-berlin.de/Foettinger/Projekte/SVT137155/svt137155.pdf Details about 137 155, German

SVT 137
Diesel multiple units of Germany
German streamliner trains
High-speed trains of Germany
Land speed record rail vehicles